The Danish Nobility Association (or the Association of the Danish Nobility; Danish: Dansk Adels Forening, DAF) is an organization for the Danish and Norwegian nobility.

The main purpose of the association is the publication of the Yearbook of the Danish Nobility, a publication that details the genealogies, titles, and coats of arms of Danish and Norwegian noble families. The Danish Nobility Association acts as an interest group on behalf of the Danish nobility, which has official status in the Kingdom of Denmark.

The association is a member of the pan-European umbrella-organisation for nobility, CILANE. The current President is Anna von Lowzow.

History 
The Danish Nobility Association was created by a merger of Dansk Adelsforbund (created in 1908) and the Association for the Publication of the Yearbook of the Danish Nobility (created in 1901). The merger took effect on 1 January 1983.

He saw an opportunity to found an association that could be the voice of the nobility in turbulent times. In a way, it was opportune, for the change of system in 1901 had put a significant end to the established and reviled landlord system of the previous decades, which the nobility in particular had to suffer. And the nobility in particular feared the consequences of the June Constitution's promissory clause to abolish the majorats, i.e. the ties that had held counties, baronies and entailed estates together since the establishment of absolute monarchy by law in 1665.

Baron Zytphen-Adeler founded the "Association for the Publication of the Yearbook of the Danish Nobility" in 1901 with Tage lensbaron Reedtz-Thott as president. In 1907, Zytphen-Adeler further founded the "Danish Adelsforbund". The publisher of the present book is an amalgamation of these two associations, which in the 21st century have the dual function of protecting the interests of the nobility and publishing the Yearbook of the Danish Nobility.

Sources

References 

Danish nobility
Norwegian nobility
Danish noble families
Norwegian noble families
Organizations established in 1983
Organizations established in 1908
Organizations based in Copenhagen